Jonathan Hsu is an American business executive with a background in media, digital marketing and advertising. He is a member of the World Economic Forum Future of the Internet Council, as well as The Paley Center for Media and the Vistage CEO global community. 

Hsu is of Taiwanese descent.

Career

He has a BA in economics from Harvard University and an MBA in strategic management and finance from the Wharton School of the University of Pennsylvania. Hsu spent time as an M&A investment banker at JP Morgan Securities. 

He was the chief executive officer of Recyclebank from 2010 to 2014 and the chief executive officer of 24/7 Real Media (part of WPP plc) for 11 years.

In 2014-2018 he served as the chief financial officer of AppNexus.

See also 
Aaron Shapiro

References

External links
Tech Crunch article featuring Jonathan Hsu
Wall Street Journal - The Next Big Thing
Xconomy feature

Living people
American chief executives
American people of Taiwanese descent
American advertising executives
Harvard University alumni
American chief financial officers
Wharton School of the University of Pennsylvania alumni
Year of birth missing (living people)
WPP plc people